Microtropis argentea is a species of tree in the family Celastraceae. It is endemic to Borneo, where it is confined to Sarawak.

References

argentea
Endemic flora of Borneo
Trees of Borneo
Flora of Sarawak
Vulnerable plants
Taxonomy articles created by Polbot